Gabriela Anna Morawska-Stanecka (born 17 March 1968) is a Polish lawyer, manager and politician.

Biography 
She graduated from the Faculty of Law and Administration of the Jagiellonian University. Morawska-Stanecka worked as a civil law notary and later as a barrister. In 1994–2006, she participated in heavy industry restructuring processes in Poland. She was also on the supervisory committee of an energy corporation.

Morawska-Stanecka was the Democratic Left Alliance candidate for the Polish Senate in Silesia (Tychy and Mysłowice as well as Bieruń-Lędziny County) in 2019. She defeated Czesław Ryszka, of the Law and Justice party, with Morawska-Stanecka receiving 50.93% of the vote. After taking office as a member of the Senate, Morawska-Stanecka was elected to the position of deputy marshal, assuming that role on 12 November 2019. Morawska-Stanecka is the deputy leader of the centre-left Spring (Polish: Wiosna) party, where she is responsible for legal and legislative matters.

References

Members of the Senate of Poland 2019–2023
Polish women lawyers
21st-century Polish lawyers
Living people
1968 births
21st-century women lawyers